Alvania elisae is a species of minute sea snail, a marine gastropod mollusk or micromollusk in the family Rissoidae.

Description

Distribution

References

External links
 Alvania elisae at Sealifebase.org

Rissoidae
Gastropods described in 2001